The Vatican City was unofficially represented at the 2022 Mediterranean Games in Oran, Algeria from 25 June to 6 July 2022. The nation's unofficial appearance at these games marked its debut and as the first country to participate in any international multi-sport event without a National Olympic Committee or National Paralympic Committee.

Background
Before its participation in these games, a delegation from the Vatican was present at the 2019 Games of the Small States of Europe in Montenegro, but were only allowed to observe. They were scheduled to compete officially at the 2021 Games of the Small States of Europe through a partnership with the Italian Olympic Committee but the event was cancelled because of the COVID-19 pandemic and to avoid scheduling conflict with the 2020 Summer Olympics. The Vatican was also present at the 2022 Championships of the Small States of Europe which also scored the delegates with a "non-scoring" manner despite one of the competitors being the third fastest at the women's 5000 m.

The lone delegate for these games, despite being Italian got eligibility to represent the nation is linked to her mother's employment there as an administrative worker.

Athletics
Vatican City got invited to send a sole representative by local organizers, Sara Carnicelli, who is the sole representative participated in the women's half marathon. In the women's half marathon she would have been placed 9th, but since she was scored in a "non-scoring" way, she is unplaced in the ranks.
Track & road events
Women

See also
Sport in Vatican City

References

External links

Nations at the 2022 Mediterranean Games
2022 in Vatican City
Sport in Vatican City